Agelena shillongensis is a species of spider in the family Agelenidae, which contains at least 1,315 species of funnel-web spiders . It was first described by Tikader in 1969. It is commonly found in India.

References

shillongensis
Spiders of the Indian subcontinent
Spiders described in 1969